Eveleth-Gilbert High School (EGHS) is a public school located in Eveleth, Minnesota, United States, and is part of the Rock Ridge Public Schools, District 2909.

Classes offered 
Classes offered at EGHS include but are not limited too:

 AP Biology
 REACH
 HOPE
 PSEO
 Band
 Team Sports
 Medical Science

Sports

Fall sports
 Boys and girls cross country running, boys and girls soccer, football, girls swimming and diving, girls tennis, volleyball.

Winter sports
 Boys and girls alpine skiing, boys and girls Nordic skiing, boys basketball, boys hockey, boys swimming and diving, dance team, girls basketball, girls hockey, wrestling.

Spring sports
 Baseball, boys and girls golf, boys and girls track, boys tennis, softball.

References

High schools in Minnesota
Schools in St. Louis County, Minnesota
Educational institutions established in 1918
1918 establishments in Minnesota